Évidemment may refer to:
 "Évidemment" (France Gall song), 1987
 "Évidemment" (Orelsan and Angèle song), 2022
 "Évidemment" (La Zarra song), the French entry for Eurovision 2023